Balik Pulau may refer to:
Balik Pulau
Balik Pulau (federal constituency), represented in the Dewan Rakyat
Balik Pulau (state constituency), formerly represented in the Penang State Legislative Assembly (1959–74)